The M2/M6 Logan Motorway is a 30-kilometre toll road between Ipswich and the M1 or Pacific Motorway at Loganholme, and the Gateway Motorway, providing access to the Gold Coast on the eastern seaboard and to the rural areas of the Darling Downs to the west. The M6 portion runs from the Pacific Motorway to the junction with the Gateway Motorway at Drewvale, where it then becomes the M2, continuing on to merge with the Ipswich Motorway at Gailes.

The road is operated and owned by Transurban Queensland. Most of this road was formally Metroad 4 prior to the Gateway Motorway extension in 1997.

History

The Logan Motorway Act of 1987 permitted a franchise period of 30 years from completion of construction.  The original owner was the Logan Motorway Company Ltd, later a company of Queensland Motorways. Russell Hinze attended a ceremony at Loganlea for the turning of the first sod in the construction of the Logan Motorway in October 1987.

It originally opened as a two-lane motorway on 13 December 1988, and was upgraded to four in two stages. The first stage of the duplication (Ipswich Motorway to Wembley Road) was completed in December 1996, followed by the second (Wembley Road to Pacific Motorway) on 23 May 2000. The Gateway Motorway was linked in 1997.

Toll booths at Wembley Road were removed in April 1997.  Too many heavy vehicles were avoiding the toll by using Compton Road.

In December 2020, a man on the Logan Motorway was shot dead by police as he approached them with a knife in his hand.

Upgrade
In 2015, the road was deemed to be a traffic bottleneck.  It was exceeding its planned capacity with up to 60,000 vehicles per day using the motorway. Late in the same year it was announced that Transurban would upgrade the Logan Motorway . It underwent a $450 million upgrade constructed from 2016 through to 2019. The upgrade, known as the Logan Enhancement Project, included upgrades to the Logan Motorway and Gateway Motorway:
 widening Gateway Motorway to three lanes in each direction from Compton Road to Logan Motorway and new south-facing ramps at Compton Road
 widening Logan Motorway to up to four lanes in each direction between Wembley Road and Beaudesert Road / Mount Lindesay Highway
 relocating the Logan Motorway on and off-ramps at Wembley Road
 new underpass from Beaudesert Road southbound to Logan Motorway westbound
 new service roads between Gateway Motorway and Beaudesert Road / Mount Lindesay Highway, bypassing the Logan Motorway
 the upgrades funded from an increase in Class 4 (commercial truck tolls)

Tolls
The road is operated and owned by Transurban Queensland. The state continued to own the road and bridge infrastructure. Electronic free-flow tolling was implemented in 2009.

Tolls on the Logan Motorway were originally due to expire 30 years after opening, in 2018. In April 2011, the tolls were extended to 2051 as a result of the transfer of Queensland Motorways' tollways to the Queensland Investment Corporation (QIC).

The motorway has three toll points:
 Loganlea toll point: east of Loganlea Road, and the eastbound exit and westbound entry ramps to / from Loganlea Road
 Heathwood toll point: west of Stapylton Road, and the westbound exit and eastbound entry ramps to / from Stapylton Road
 Paradise Road toll point: westbound exit and eastbound entry ramps to / from Paradise Road

Additionally, all traffic between the Logan Motorway and Gateway Extension must pass through the Kuraby or Compton Road toll points of the Gateway Extension. This means travel on any section of Logan Motorway between Stapylton Road and Loganlea Road incurs two tolls (a combination of any Gateway Motorway or Logan Motorway tolls). The short sections of Logan Motorway between Ipswich Motorway and Centenary Motorway and between Drews Road and Pacific Motorway are toll-free.

Exits and interchanges

See also

 Freeways in Australia
 Freeways in Brisbane

References

External links

Qld Motorways

Highways in Queensland
Roads in Brisbane
Toll roads in Australia
Logan City
Transport infrastructure completed in 1988
1988 establishments in Australia
Ipswich, Queensland